Tabernamine is a bisindole isolate of Tabernaemontana with anticancer activity.

Derivatives
19,20-dihydrotabernamine is said to have potent acetylcholinesterase inhibitor activity greater than galantamine.

Notes

 Plant anticancer agents V: new bisindole alkaloids from Tabernaemontana johnstonii stem bark

Alkaloids found in Apocynaceae